The Jazz Version of No Strings (complete title The Coleman Hawkins Quartet Play The Jazz Version of No Strings) is an album by saxophonist Coleman Hawkins featuring tracks from the musical drama No Strings written by Richard Rodgers, which was recorded in 1962 and released on the Moodsville label. 
Allmusic awarded the album 3 stars.

Track listing 
All compositions by Richard Rodgers
 "Look No Further" - 4:28
 "La La La" - 3:18
 "Nobody Told Me" - 3:20
 "Maine" - 3:11
 "Loads of Love" - 4:10
 "The Sweetest Sounds" - 4:17
 "Be My Host" - 3:03
 "The Man Who Has Everything" - 5:56
 "No Strings" - 4:44

Personnel 
Coleman Hawkins - tenor saxophone
Tommy Flanagan - piano
Major Holley - bass
Eddie Locke - drums

References 

Coleman Hawkins albums
1962 albums
Moodsville Records albums
Albums recorded at Van Gelder Studio
Albums produced by Esmond Edwards